The Shenzhen Open was a professional men's tennis tournament. It was played on outdoor hard courts of the Shenzhen Longgang Tennis Center, which has 32 outdoor and indoor courts and a 4,000-seat stadium. In late 2013 it was announced that Shenzhen had won the ATP Thailand Open franchise, holding its inaugural ATP tournament in September 2014.

Past finals

Men's singles

Men's doubles

References

External links
Official ATP site

 
Recurring sporting events established in 2014
Tennis tournaments in China
Hard court tennis tournaments
Sport in Shenzhen
2014 establishments in China
Sports competitions in Guangdong